Khoshkrud (also Romanized as Khoshkrūd; also known as Khoshg Rood, Khoshkeh Rūd, and Kūshkarūt) is a city in Khoshkrud Rural District, in the Central District of Zarandieh County, Markazi Province, Iran. At the 2006 census, its population was 6,059, in 1,249 families.

References 

Cities in Markazi Province
Populated places in Zarandieh County